The Laurence Olivier Award for Best Costume Design is an annual award presented by the Society of London Theatre in recognition of achievements in commercial London theatre. The awards were established as the Society of West End Theatre Awards in 1976, and renamed in 1984 in honour of English actor and director Laurence Olivier.

This award was introduced in 1991. There had been an award for Designer of the Year from 1976 to 1990, originally focused on set designers but including an increasing number of commingled nominations for other design specialties through the years. The commingled single award was retired after the 1990 ceremony, with more granular awards introduced in 1991 for Best Set Design and Best Lighting Design, along with this Best Costume Design award.

Winners and nominees

1990s

2000s

2010s

2020s

Multiple awards and nominations for Best Costume Design

Awards
Two awards
Alison Chitty
Deirdre Clancy
William Dudley
Tim Goodchild
Christopher Oram
Mark Thompson
Vicki Mortimer

Nominations
Six nominations
Rob Howell
Christopher Oram

Five nominations
Bob Crowley
Mark Thompson
Anthony Ward

Four nominations
Gregg Barnes
William Dudley
Hugh Durrant

Three nominations
Deirdre Clancy
Nicky Gillibrand
Robert Jones
William Ivey Long
Catherine Zuber

Two nominations
Sue Blane
Alison Chitty
Tim Goodchild
Tim Hatley
Roger Kirk
Peter McKintosh
Jon Morrell
Vicki Mortimer
Martin Pakledinaz
Paul Tazewell
Jenny Tiramani

See also
 Drama Desk Award for Outstanding Costume Design
 Tony Award for Best Costume Design

References

External links
 

Costume Design
Costume design awards